Unchained, also known as American II: Unchained, is the second album in Johnny Cash's American Recordings series (and his 82nd overall). It was released on November 5, 1996, by American Recordings. Like all of Cash's albums for American Recordings, Unchained was produced by Rick Rubin. The album received a Grammy for Best Country Album and Cash was nominated for Best Male Country Vocal Performance for his version of "Rusty Cage."

Background
In contrast to the first album – on which Cash played alone – he is backed by Tom Petty and the Heartbreakers. There are guest appearances by country music veteran Marty Stuart (additional guitar on more than half the songs); Flea (bassist from Red Hot Chili Peppers), on "Spiritual"; and by Lindsey Buckingham and Mick Fleetwood, both of Fleetwood Mac, on "Sea of Heartbreak".

Unchained focuses on covers. In addition to three of Cash's own compositions, Unchained contained songs by Jude Johnstone ("Unchained"), Tom Petty ("Southern Accents"), Spain ("Spiritual"), Soundgarden ("Rusty Cage"), and Beck ("Rowboat").  The album also included a cover of the classic 1962 Hank Snow song, "I've Been Everywhere", written by Geoff Mack. From 2003 to 2009 Johnny Cash’s version of "I’ve Been Everywhere" from this album Unchained has been used in several Choice Hotels commercials and has been the theme for these commercials. It was also used in a USPS commercial from 2021-2022. Cash’s I’ve Been Everywhere has also been used as a soundtrack in Season 2 of the animated series The Grim Adventures of Billy & Mandy.   According to biographer Robert Hilburn, Cash also recorded a cover version of Robert Palmer's "Addicted to Love" during the recording sessions for Unchained, but it was not released.

The album was recorded over a six-month period with engineer Sylvia Massy at Sound City Studios.

Previous recordings
Two songs on the album had previously been recorded by Cash.
"Country Boy" was previously recorded by Cash for his 1957 album Johnny Cash with His Hot and Blue Guitar!
"Mean Eyed Cat" was previously recorded by Cash for his 1960 album Johnny Cash Sings Hank Williams.

Track listing

Personnel
Adapted from the album liner notes.
 Johnny Cash – vocals, acoustic guitar
 Tom Petty – vocals, acoustic guitar, electric guitar, bass, chamberlin
 Mike Campbell – acoustic guitar, electric guitar, bass, mandolin, Dobro
 Benmont Tench – piano, hammond organ, vox continental organ, harmonium, chamberlin 
 Rick DePiro - piano, organ (8, 13) 
 Howie Epstein – acoustic guitar, bass
 Steve Ferrone – drums and percussion (1, 2, 3, 4, 5, 6, 10, 12, 14)
 Curt Bisquera – drums and percussion (7, 8)
 Marty Stuart – acoustic guitar, electric guitar, bass (1, 4, 5, 10, 11, 12, 13, 14)
 Flea – bass (7)
 Lindsey Buckingham – acoustic guitar (2)
 Mick Fleetwood – percussion (2)
 Juliet Prater – percussion (3)
 Rick Rubin – producer
 David Ferguson – engineer
 Sylvia Massy – engineer, mixing
 John Ewing Jr., Greg Fidelman, Eddie Miller, Michael Stock – assistant engineers
 Gene Grimaldi, Eddy Schreyer – mastering (Oasis Mastering)
 Martyn Atkins – art direction, photography
 Christine Cano – art direction, design, photography, inlay photography
 Andy Earl – photography

Charts
Album - Billboard (United States)

Certifications

External links
 Luma Electronic's Johnny Cash discography listing

References

1996 albums
Johnny Cash albums
Albums produced by Rick Rubin
American Recordings (record label) albums
Sequel albums
Warner Records albums
Grammy Award for Best Country Album
Tom Petty
Albums recorded at Sound City Studios
Covers albums